Jingzu may refer to:

Gin people, descendants of ethnic Vietnamese (Kinh) in China
Ancestor veneration in China

Temple name
Wugunai (1021–1074), Jurchen chieftain who was honored as Jingzong in the Jin dynasty
Giocangga (1526–1583), Jurchen chieftain who was honored as Jingzong in the Qing dynasty

Temple name disambiguation pages